Tour des Fjords (known as the Rogaland Grand Prix until 2012) was a road bicycle race held annually between 2008 and 2018 in the region of western Norway. The race merged with the Tour of Norway prior to its 2019 edition, with Tour des Fjords AS becoming its organiser.

Winners

References

External links

Tour des Fjords and Tour of Norway merge

 
UCI Europe Tour races
Cycle races in Norway
Recurring sporting events established in 2008
2008 establishments in Norway
Recurring sporting events disestablished in 2018
2018 disestablishments in Norway
Sport in Stavanger
Summer events in Norway